The Bay Area Circus Arts Festival (formerly the Berkeley Juggling and Unicycling Festival) was an annual 3-day event in the San Francisco Bay Area of California, held by the Berkeley Juggling Collective. It featured workshops, casual instruction, and mini-competitions in various types of circus arts, including unicycling, hat-tossing, whip cracking, tumbling and multiple styles of juggling (contact, pin, diabolo, endurance, etc.).  The event was free for everyone and many people learned to juggle or unicycle at the festival.

A highlight of the multi-day festival was its vaudeville-style variety show, featuring local, national and international artists performing in live stage performances.  Past performances included acrobatics, hoop dancing, aerial/silk dance, puppeteering, as well as the arts featured in the festival.

Past festival dates:
 2014-10-03-2014-10-05, festival webpage 2014
 2013-10-04-2013-10-06, festival webpage 2013
 2012-08-17–2012-08-19, festival webpage 2012
 2010-07-09–2010-07-11, festival webpage 2010
 2009-09-18–2009-09-20, festival webpage 2009
 2008-10-10–2008-10-12, festival webpage 2008
 2007-10-05–2007-10-07, festival webpage 2007
 2006-09-29–2006-10-01, festival webpage 2006
 2005-10-07–2005-10-09, festival webpage 2005

References

External links 
 Official website
 Video highlights of 2007 Festival, on YouTube

Festivals in the San Francisco Bay Area
Juggling conventions
Unicycling
Culture of Berkeley, California
Circus festivals